Busan BNK Sum is a professional basketball club in the Women's Korean Basketball League in South Korea.

Honours

Women's Korean Basketball League 

WKBL Championship
 Winners (1): 2004 (winter)
 Runners-up (1): 2010–11

WKBL Regular Season
 Runners-up (2): 2005 (winter), 2011–12

External links
Official website 

Basketball teams established in 2000
Basketball teams in South Korea
Women's basketball teams in South Korea
Women's Korean Basketball League teams
Sport in Incheon
Sport in Gyeonggi Province
Sport in Busan
2000 establishments in South Korea